Adrian Basta (born 1 December 1988) is a Polish professional footballer who plays as a defender for IV liga club Barciczanka Barcice.

References

External links 
 

1988 births
Living people
Polish footballers
Poland under-21 international footballers
Polonia Bytom players
Sandecja Nowy Sącz players
Kolejarz Stróże players
GKS Bełchatów players
Górnik Łęczna players
Hutnik Nowa Huta players
Ekstraklasa players
I liga players
II liga players
Sportspeople from Nowy Sącz
Association football defenders